Kunta Kinte is a solo album released by rapper, Keak da Sneak. The album is essentially a re-release of 2005's Town Business with a few extra tracks.

Reception

Track listing
"Scarface Dust"- 3:41 
"Blind to Get It"- 3:39 
"Super Hyphy"- 3:26 
"Town Business"- 4:36 
"Get That Doe"- 3:24 
"T-Shirt Blue Jeans & Nike's #2"- 3:18 
"Bumpers"- 4:36 
"Light Gray Shit"- 4:53 
"Support Your Own Supple"- 3:47 (Featuring Luni Coleone)
"What a Relief"- 3:46 
"All My Niggas"- 3:15 
"Dope House's and Powder"- 4:39 
"Leanin"- 4:10 
"Lookin at Booty"- 4:48 
"Yeah"- 6:25

References 

2006 albums
Keak da Sneak albums
Albums produced by Big Hollis